Tom Wu (born 15 May 1972) is a Hong Kong-born British actor who grew up in Chinatown, London. He is a martial arts expert who has appeared in films such as Revolver, Shanghai Knights, Batman Begins and the Bollywood film Ra.One.

Biography
At the age of ten, Wu began practising various martial arts such as Hung Gar, karate and Wing Chun and later took up acrobatics. In 1988, he competed for Britain at China's International wu-shu (martial arts) tournament, winning two bronze medals and a gold medal. He is one of the founding members of the British theatre company Yellow Earth Theatre, which was established in 1995.

He is known for playing numerous Chinese Triad gang member or leader roles in various films. Such as Out for a Kill, Wake of Death, Revolver and Kick-Ass 2 and most recently, in 2019 playing a criminal and tattoo artist in the Fast & Furious spin-off Hobbs & Shaw and playing the Chinese Triad leader Lord George in the British film The Gentlemen.

One of his notable roles was in The Scorpion King 2 (2008) where he played Fung, a Chinese Ming dynasty soldier rescued by Mathayus and his allies and who later assists them towards the end of the film.

He portrayed the character Hundred Eyes in the Netflix original series Marco Polo before its abrupt cancellation in late 2016.

Recently, Wu has played the role of Sir George, King Arthur's mentor in King Arthur: Legend of the Sword in 2017.

In 2018, Wu played the role of Hong Kong Inspector Daniel Tsui in the series Strangers.

Filmography

References

External links
 

1972 births
English martial artists
Hong Kong emigrants to England
Hong Kong male actors
Living people
English male actors
Male actors from London
British male actors of Chinese descent
People from Westminster
Hong Kong martial artists
British male karateka